Kate Charles (born 1950) is an American crime writer who lives in the United Kingdom and is a British citizen.

Kate Charles was born Carol Fosher in Cincinnati, the daughter of Elmer and Kathryn Fosher. Her family moved to Bloomington, Illinois, when she was 10. She graduated from Bloomington High School and went on to Illinois State University where she graduated with a bachelor's degree in library science in 1972.  She then went on to earn an MA from Indiana University.  She married Rory Chase and lives in Ludlow, Shropshire, UK.  She is a past Chair of the Crime Writers' Association and the Barbara Pym Society.  In 1996 she underwent open-heart surgery. She was elected to membership in the Detection Club in 2010. In 2012 she was awarded the George N. Dove Award by the Popular Culture Association for 'Outstanding Contribution to the Serious Study of Mystery and Crime Fiction', in recognition of her work as co-organiser of the annual St Hilda's (Oxford) Crime and Mystery Conference since 1994.

Charles's novels are mostly set against the background of the Church of England. Her 2005 novel, Evil Intent, was the first of her books to introduce a female Anglican priest as a central character; other series characters include solicitor David Middleton-Brown and artist Lucy Kingsley. Her novels evince a fascination with church politics.

Novels
A Drink of Deadly Wine 1991
The Snares of Death 1992
Appointed to Die 1993
A Dead Man Out of Mind 1994
Evil Angels Among Them 1995
Unruly Passions 1998
Strange Children 1999
Cruel Habitations 2000
Evil Intent 2005 
Secret Sins 2007
Deep Waters 2009
False Tongues 2015
Desolate Places 2021

References

External links
http://www.katecharles.com//

1950 births
Living people
British crime fiction writers
Writers from Ludlow
Indiana University alumni
Illinois State University alumni
Writers from Cincinnati
Members of the Detection Club
Women mystery writers
Date of birth missing (living people)
American emigrants to England
Bloomington High School (Bloomington, Illinois) alumni
British women novelists
Novelists from Ohio
20th-century British novelists
20th-century British women writers
21st-century British novelists
21st-century British women writers